Azur (also called GRS-A) was West Germany's first scientific satellite. Launched on 8 November 1969 it studied the Van Allen belts, solar particles, and aurorae.

The construction of the satellite was carried out by Ludwig Bölkow, one of the aeronautical pioneers of Germany, and with the participation of other German companies.

References

External links
 Encyclopedia of Science - Azur

Satellites of Germany
Science and technology in West Germany
First artificial satellites of a country
Spacecraft launched in 1969